Spanish–Portuguese War may refer to one of the following conflicts between Portugal and Spain (or between Portugal and Castile before 1492):

 Fernandine Wars (1369–70, 1372–73, 1381–82), when Portugal attempted to claim the Castilian throne
 1383–1385 Portuguese interregnum, when Castile attempted to claim the Portuguese throne
 War of the Castilian Succession (1475–79), when Portugal intervened unsuccessfully in a Castilian civil war
 War of the Portuguese Succession (1580–83), when Portugal passed under the rule of the Spanish Monarchy
 Portuguese Restoration War (1640–68), when Portugal regained its sovereignty
 War of the Spanish Succession (1701–13)
 Spanish–Portuguese War (1735–37), fought over the Banda Oriental (Uruguay)
 Spanish–Portuguese War (1762–63), known as the Fantastic War
 Spanish–Portuguese War (1776–77), fought over the border between Spanish and Portuguese South America
 War of the Oranges in 1801, when Spain and France defeated Portugal in the Iberian Peninsula, while Portugal defeated Spain in South America
 Invasion of Portugal (1807), a French invasion initially supported by Spain
 Liberal Wars
 Patuleia 
 Spanish Civil War, when Portugal supported the "nationalist" or francoist coalition against the Second Spanish Republic.

See also
 1383–85 Crisis, when Castile intervened unsuccessfully in a Portuguese civil war
 List of wars involving Spain

Wars involving Spain
Portugal–Spain military relations
Wars involving Portugal